The HIStory World Tour was the third and final worldwide solo concert tour by American singer and recording artist Michael Jackson, covering Africa,  Asia, Europe, Oceania and North America. The tour included a total of 82 concerts spanning the globe with stops in 57 cities, 35 countries on 5 continents.
The tour promoted Jackson's 1995 album HIStory: Past, Present and Future, Book I. The second leg also promoted the remix album Blood on the Dance Floor: HIStory in the Mix.
The tour was attended by over 4.5 million fans.

Overview 

The tour was announced on May 29, 1996, and marked Jackson's first concert tour since his Dangerous World Tour ended in late 1993. Jackson's debut concert for the tour, performed at Letna Park in Prague, was one of the largest single attended concerts in his career,  with over 125,000 people. On October 7, 1996, he performed for the first time ever in the Arab world and Africa as a solo artist in Tunis. During the tour's stopover in Sydney, Australia, he married Debbie Rowe in a private and impromptu ceremony. He was interviewed by Molly Meldrum In Brisbane and danced with two women during "You Are Not Alone". From January 3–4, 1997, Jackson performed his only two concerts on this tour in the US, in Honolulu, Hawaii, at the Aloha Stadium, to a crowd of 35,000 each; making him the first artist in history to sell out the stadium.

During the break period, Jackson worked and released his Blood on the Dance Floor: HIStory in the Mix album. The second leg started on May 31, 1997, at the Weserstadion in Bremen, Germany. Set list changes included the addition of "Blood on the Dance Floor" and later on the removal of the "Off the Wall" Medley and "The Way You Make Me Feel". "Blood on the Dance Floor" was taken off the set list after the concert in Oslo on August 19, 1997.

Jackson performed at the Parken Stadium in Copenhagen, Denmark on his 39th birthday with 60,000 fans. He was presented with a surprise birthday cake, marching band, and fireworks on stage after "You Are Not Alone". The concert at Hippodrome Wellington of Ostend, Belgium, was originally scheduled for August 31, 1997, but was postponed to September 3 following Diana, Princess of Wales's death.

There were some initial plans to take the tour, in February 1997, to such Brazilian cities as Sao Paulo, Curitiba, Rio de Janeiro, and Brasília; but these plans were suspended due to promotional issues. Jackson tried to visit Brazil again in February 1998, as well as Argentina, but these too were scrapped so that he could work on MJ and Friends.

Recordings 
Throughout the tour, many concerts were professionally filmed by Nocturne Productions, but none were ever officially released on DVD. In South Korea, a VHS recording of his show in Seoul was released, only within the bounds of the country. Although the footage is poor in quality and Michael Jackson was suffering a fever at the time, resulting in his vocals being weakened, it made major success in that country. Jackson planned to release a DVD of his performance in Munich, Germany. The film was never released due to Jackson being unimpressed by his vocals brought on by laryngitis.

Show performance 
Michael Jackson's HIStory tour was one of his most high tech concert shows of the time. The show's opening featured a video segment where Jackson piloted a spacecraft through multiple points in history before emerging from underneath the stage at the end. The stage featured two statues of Jackson on either side of it, and was large enough to use an entire curtain for the opening segment of "Smooth Criminal".

Set list

 "Great Gates Of Kiev" (Introduction)
 "Scream" / "They Don't Care About Us" / “In the Closet" (contains excerpts of "HIStory",  "Great Gates Of Kiev" and "She Drives Me Wild")
 "Wanna Be Startin' Somethin'"
 "Stranger in Moscow"
 "Smooth Criminal" (contains elements of "Childhood")
 "The Wind"  (Video Interlude)
 "You Are Not Alone"
 "The Way You Make Me Feel"
 "I Want You Back" / "The Love You Save" / "I'll Be There"
 "Rock with You" / "Off the Wall" / "Don't Stop 'Til You Get Enough"
 "Remember The Time" (Video Interlude)
 "Billie Jean"
 "Thriller"
 "Beat It"
 "Blood On The Dance Floor"
 "Come Together" / "D.S."
 "Black Panther" (Video Interlude)
 "Dangerous" (contains elements from "James Bond Theme", "Smooth Criminal", "You Want This", "Let's Dance", and "The Good, the Bad and the Ugly")
 "Black or White"
 "Earth Song"
 "We Are The World" (Video Interlude)
"Heal the World"
 "HIStory" (contains elements from "They Don't Care About Us" and "Great Gates Of Kiev")

Tour dates

Cancelled shows

Known preparation dates

Personnel
HIStory World Tour

Lead performer
Vocals, Dance, Choreographer: Michael Jackson

Dancers

1996 leg
LaVelle Smith 
Cris Judd
Travis Payne
Damon Navandi
Courtney Miller
Jason Yribar
Anthony Talauega
Richmond Talauega
Shawnette Heard
Lori Werner

1997 leg
LaVelle Smith
Cris Judd
Anthony Talauega
Richmond Talauega
Stacy Walker
Faune Chambers

Band members
Musical Director: Brad Buxer
Assistant Musical Director: Kevin Dorsey
Keyboards: Isaiah Sanders, Brad Buxer
Drums: Jonathan Moffett
Guitars: Jennifer Batten, Greg Howe (1996 leg – replaced Jennifer Batten in Amsterdam (October 2), Tunis and Seoul), David Williams
Bass: Freddie Washington
Vocal Director: Kevin Dorsey
Vocals: Kevin Dorsey, Dorian Holley, Marva Hicks (1996–1997 leg), Darryl Phinnessee (1996 leg), Fred White (1997 leg)

Credits
Executive Director: MJJ Productions
Artistic Director: Michael Jackson
Assistant Director: Peggy Holmes
Choreographed by: Michael Jackson & LaVelle Smith
Staged & Designed by: Kenny Ortega
Set Designed by: Michael Cotton & John McGraw
Lighting Designer: Peter Morse
Security 1996: Darrell Featherstone 
Security 1997: Bill Bray 
Costumes Designed by: Dennis Tompkins & Michael Bush
Hair & Make-up: Karen Faye and Tommy Sims
Stylist: Tommy Sims
Tour Producer and Personal Manager: Tarak Ben Ammar
Personal Management: Gallin Morey Associates
Music Video Directors: Steve Barron, Joe Pytka, John Landis, Bruce Gowers, Martin Scorsese, Bob Giraldi, John Singleton and Nick Saxton

Sponsor
Kingdom Entertainment

See also 
 List of highest-attended concerts
 List of highest-grossing concert tours

Notes

References

Bibliography

Michael Jackson concert tours
1996 concert tours
1997 concert tours